Global Automotive Research Center (GARC) is a unit under National Automotive Testing and R&D Infrastructure Project (NATRiP) housing the facilities for comprehensive testing services. GARC provides certification testing and R&D support to the automotive vehicle and component manufacturers in India. The GARC which is under construction is spread over 304 acres with combined office space and test labs at the SIPCOT Industrial Growth Centre near Chennai at Oragadam.  The center will have certification test facilities to conduct the performance testing of full range of automobile. The center will also have the center of excellence for Passive Safety, EMC and Automotive Infotronics.

Facilities at the center
The following facilities are planned at GARC -

 Infotronics Lab (Center of Excellence).
 Passive Safety Lab (Center of Excellence)
 EMC Lab (Center of Excellence)
 Powertrain Lab.
 Fatigue Lab.
 Certification Lab.
 Material Lab.
 Component Lab.
 Homologation Tracks.

Categories of customers served
Four wheeler manufacturers/Commercial vehicle manufacturers/ Three wheeler Manufacturers/ Two wheeler Manufacturers/Construction equipment vehicle manufacturers/ Agriculture equipment (Tractors) manufacturers/E-Rickshaw manufacturers/ Bus body Manufacturers/ CNG-LPG kit retrofitters/Automotive & Non-Automotive engine Manufacturers/DG set manufacturers/Automotive Component Manufacturers.

Automotive industry in India